In geometry, the snub icosidodecadodecahedron is a nonconvex uniform polyhedron, indexed as U46. It has 104 faces (80 triangles, 12 pentagons, and 12 pentagrams), 180 edges, and 60 vertices. As the name indicates, it belongs to the family of snub polyhedra.

The circumradius of the snub icosidodecadodecahedron with unit edge length is

Related polyhedra

Medial hexagonal hexecontahedron

The medial hexagonal hexecontahedron is a nonconvex isohedral polyhedron. It is the dual of the uniform snub icosidodecadodecahedron.

See also 
 List of uniform polyhedra

References

External links 
 

Uniform polyhedra